Lord John George de la Poer Beresford  (22 November 1773 – 18 July 1862) was an Anglican archbishop and Primate.

Background
Born at Tyrone House, Dublin, he was the second surviving son of George de La Poer Beresford, 1st Marquess of Waterford and his wife Elizabeth, only daughter of Henry Monck and maternal granddaughter of Henry Bentinck, 1st Duke of Portland. He attended Eton College and Christ Church, Oxford, where he graduated with a Bachelor of Arts in 1793 and a Master of Arts three years later.

Career
Beresford was ordained a priest in 1797 and began his ecclesiastical career with incumbencies at Clonegal and Newtownlennan. In 1799 he became Dean of Clogher; and was raised to the episcopate as Bishop of Cork and Ross in 1805. He was translated becoming Bishop of Raphoe two years later and was appointed 90th Bishop of Clogher in 1819. Beresford was again translated to become Archbishop of Dublin in the next year and was sworn of the Privy Council of Ireland. In 1822, he went on to be the 106th Archbishop of Armagh and therefore also Primate of All Ireland. He became Prelate of the Order of St Patrick and Lord Almoner of Ireland. Having been vice-chancellor from 1829, he was appointed the 15th Chancellor of the University of Dublin in 1851, a post he held until his death in 1862.

Restoration of St Patrick's Cathedral
Beresford employed Lewis Nockalls Cottingham, one of the most skilled architects at that time, to restore Armagh's St Patrick's Cathedral. Cottingham removed the old stunted spire and shored up the belfry stages while he re-built the piers and arches under it. The arcade walls which had fallen away as much as 21 inches from the perpendicular on the south side and 7 inches on the North side, were straightened by means of heated irons, and the clerestory windows which had long been concealed, were opened out, and filled with tracery.

Beresford is unsympathetically represented by Montalembert with whom he had breakfast at Gurteen de la Poer during his tour of Ireland.

Beresford died at Woburn, the home of his niece, in the parish of Donaghadee; and was buried in the cathedral. There is a memorial to him  in the south aisle at St Patrick's. His immediate successor as Archbishop was his first cousin once removed.

References 

 

1773 births
1862 deaths
Christian clergy from Dublin (city)
People educated at Eton College
19th-century Anglican archbishops
Alumni of Christ Church, Oxford
Deans of Clogher
Bishops of Cork and Ross (Church of Ireland)
Anglican bishops of Raphoe
Bishops of Clogher (Church of Ireland)
Anglican archbishops of Armagh
Anglican archbishops of Dublin
Burials at St Patrick's Cathedral, Armagh (Church of Ireland)
Chancellors of the University of Dublin
Members of the Privy Council of Ireland
Irish Anglican archbishops
Younger sons of marquesses
John